Sandwich Plate System (SPS) is the name of a patented structural composite material comprising two metal plates bonded with an elastomer core.  SPS was created in partnership with chemical manufacturer BASF incorporating Elastocore ®  as the core material. The SPS material is a direct replacement for stiffened steel and reinforced concrete in heavy engineering projects.

SPS is an unlicensed technology used globally in various engineered structures including maritime ships, offshore assets, buildings, stadiums and arenas, bridges and other special applications.

History 
SPS was invented by Dr Stephen Kennedy following primary research in the field of ice-strengthened structures at Carleton University in Ottawa, Ontario, Canada and first patented in 1996. Intelligent Engineering UK Limited  was founded in April 1996 to commercialise the technology and later formally dissolved. The first recorded project involving SPS was carried out on the P&O Pride of Cherbourg, a Lloyd’s Register approved vessel in 1999.

Notable Projects
Civil engineering projects incorporating SPS include:
Resorts World Arena, at the National Exhibition Centre (NEC), Birmingham, United Kingdom
The O2, Dublin (formerly The Point), Dublin Ireland
Ascot Racecourse, London United Kingdom
London Aquatics Centre, London, United Kingdom
Cannelville Road Bridge, Muskingum Country, Ohio
Berlin U-Bhan Bridge, Berlin Germany
Lennoxville Bridge,  Quebec Canada
Ceder Creek Bridge, Texas USA
Grand Pier, Weston-super-Mare, Weston-Super-Mare UK
Dawson Bridge, Edmonton Canada
Grand Duchess Charlotte Bridge, Luxembourg City, Luxembourg
Principal Place Pavilion, London, United Kingdom
Space Needle, Seattle, Washington, United States in its 2017 renovation
PayPal Park, formerly Avaya Stadium, home San Jose Earthquakes
Philippine Arena north of Manila, Philippines
Colman Dock footbridge, Seattle Washington
USTA Billie Jean King National Tennis Center, Flushing Meadow, New York
Tynecastle Park Edinburgh, Scotland

Vessels and assets incorporating SPS include:
MV Golden Bell, Bulk Carrier
MV Star Ypsilon, Bulk Carrier
MV Docebay, Bulk Carrier
MV Hansaland, RoRo
MV Edco Star, Bulk Carrier
Solitaire (ship), Allseas' deep sea pipe-laying ship
Glen Lyon (ship) a floating production, storage and offloading vessel (FPSO), owned by BP and stationed in the North Sea
Queen Mary 2 a transatlantic ocean liner

References

Composite materials
Canadian inventions